Empress Mao may refer to:

Empress Mingdao (died 237), Chinese empress of Cao Wei
Empress Mao (Former Qin) (died 389), Chinese empress of Former Qin

Mao